The East Division was a division of the Arena Football League's American Conference. It was first formed in 1995 as part of the National Conference when expansion led to the creation of divisions.

Since the division's enfranchisement in 1995, as the Eastern Division of the National Conference, the division sent representatives to five ArenaBowls (most recently the Philadelphia Soul in 2013's ArenaBowl XXVI), with two wins (most recently the Philadelphia Soul in 2008's ArenaBowl XXII).

Division lineups
1995–1996
Albany Firebirds
Charlotte Rage
Connecticut Coyotes

Eastern Division in the National Conference. Albany moved in from American Conference. Connecticut Coyotes enfranchised.

1997
Albany Firebirds (from American Conference)
Nashville Kats
New Jersey Red Dogs
New York Cityhawks
Charlotte and Connecticut folded. Nashville, New Jersey, and New York are enfranchised.

1998
Albany Firebirds
New Jersey Red Dogs
New York Cityhawks
Nashville moved to National Conference's Southern Division.

1999–2000
Albany Firebirds
Buffalo Destroyers
New England Sea Wolves
New Jersey Red Dogs
Buffalo Destroyers enfranchised. New York moved to Hartford, Connecticut as New England Sea Wolves.

2001
Buffalo Destroyers
Carolina Cobras
New Jersey Gladiators
New York Dragons
Toronto Phantoms
As Indiana Firebirds, Albany moved to Indianapolis, Indiana as part of the American Conference's Central Division. Carolina moved in from Southern Division. Iowa Barnstormers moved to Uniondale, New York as New York Dragons. New England moved to Toronto as the Phantoms. New Jersey Red Dogs renamed the Gladiators.

2002
Buffalo Destroyers
New Jersey Gladiators
New York Dragons
Toronto Phantoms
Carolina moved back to Southern Division.

2003
Buffalo Destroyers
Detroit Fury
Las Vegas Gladiators
New York Dragons
Detroit moved in from Central Division. New Jersey moved to Las Vegas. Toronto Phantoms folded.

2004
Carolina Cobras
Columbus Destroyers
Dallas Desperados
New York Dragons
Philadelphia Soul
Buffalo moved to Columbus, Ohio. Dallas moved in from Central Division. Detroit moved back to Central Division as well. Las Vegas moved to American Conference's Western Division. Philadelphia Soul enfranchised.

2005–2007
Columbus Destroyers
Dallas Desperados
New York Dragons
Philadelphia Soul
Carolina Cobras folded.

2008
Cleveland Gladiators
Columbus Destroyers
Dallas Desperados
New York Dragons
Philadelphia Soul
Las Vegas moved back from Western Division as Cleveland Gladiators. After the 2008 season, Columbus, Dallas, and New York folded while Philadelphia is suspended and the AFL is put on a one-year hiatus. Also, the Cleveland Gladiators joined the Central Division (now part of the National Conference) for the 2010 season when that division was known as the Midwest Division.

2010
Bossier-Shreveport Battle Wings
Dallas Vigilantes
Oklahoma City Yard Dawgz
Tulsa Talons
The Eastern Division moved to the American Conference as Southwest Division for this season. Dallas Vigilantes enfranchised while the other three teams come from the defunct af2.

2011–2012
Cleveland Gladiators
Milwaukee Mustangs
Philadelphia Soul
Pittsburgh Power
The Southwest Division changed its name back to Eastern Division. Bossier-Shreveport moved to New Orleans as the VooDoo. Cleveland Gladiators and Milwaukee Iron (renamed Mustangs) moved in from the Central Division (known as Midwest in 2010). Dallas and Tulsa moved to Central Division. Oklahoma City folded. Philadelphia Soul returned. Pittsburgh Power enfranchised.

2013
Cleveland Gladiators
Philadelphia Soul
Pittsburgh Power
Milwaukee Mustangs suspended operations.

2014
Cleveland Gladiators
Iowa Barnstormers
Philadelphia Soul
Pittsburgh Power
Iowa joined the East Division after the League's expansion into Los Angeles and Portland, and the removal of the Utah Blaze and Chicago Rush.

2015
Cleveland Gladiators
New Orleans VooDoo
Philadelphia Soul
Iowa left to play in the Indoor Football League and Pittsburgh folded because of low attendance.

Due to the reduced number of participating teams, all AFL conferences and divisions were discontinued after the 2015 season.

Division champions
 
 † – Despite winning the division in 2004, the New York Dragons failed to qualify for the playoffs.

Wild Card qualifiers

Season results

References

Arena Football League divisions
Cleveland Gladiators
Philadelphia Soul
Pittsburgh Power
1995 establishments in the United States
New Orleans VooDoo
Indiana Firebirds
Charlotte Rage
Connecticut Coyotes
Nashville Kats
Toronto Phantoms
Columbus Destroyers
Carolina Cobras
New York Dragons
Detroit Fury
Dallas Desperados
Bossier–Shreveport Battle Wings
Dallas Vigilantes
Oklahoma City Yard Dawgz
San Antonio Talons
Milwaukee Mustangs (2009–2012)
Iowa Barnstormers